Kronos Foods, Inc., is a Chicago-based company which is a foodservice manufacturer of Mediterranean food in the United States and the largest manufacturer of gyros in the world. Kronos Foods is known for being one of the first to produce, standardize, and market gyro cones (an argument exists as to who exactly was the first to "invent" the first manufactured gyro cone). They also produce marketing for gyro consumption.
With over 200 employees at its factory in Glendale Heights, Illinois, Kronos has expanded its product line from just gyro meats in the late 1970s to Greek yogurt, pita, hummus, spanakopita, baklava, and other Mediterranean foods.

Kronos Foods produces around 100,000 lb (45,000 kg) of meat products daily.

History
Chris Tomaras started Kronos in 1975. It was sold to a private equity firm in 1994. It is located in Glendale Heights, Illinois. Tomaras was considered to be an entrepreneur from Chicago, Illinois.

Products
Kronos Foods is known for selling:
Gyros cone
Gyro meat
Pre-cooked gyros slices
Uncooked gyros strips 
Gyros loaves
Pita bread
Tzatziki sauce 
White satin
KronoBROIL

Information
The purpose of the company is to provide gyro ingredients so their customers can gain customers. Kronos produces meat, dairy, bakery, fillo appetizers, and dessert products. Kronos Foods distributes their products nationally through food service channels, major retailers, broadline and specialty distributors, club stores, mass merchants, and grocery chains.

Affiliations
Kronos Foods is affiliated with these partners:
Women Chefs and Restaurateurs – sponsor and member    
Research Chefs Association – sponsor and member 
International Foodservice Editorial Council – sponsor and member 
International Dairy-Deli-Bakery Association – exhibitor
National Restaurant Association – members and exhibitor
Dot Foods – partner 
Fisher House Foundation – supporter

References

External links 

Food and drink companies based in Chicago
Manufacturing companies based in Chicago
American companies established in 1975
Food and drink companies established in 1975